

Events
 March 19 – Kagemasa Kōzuki establishes Konami Industry Co., Ltd. Formerly the owner of a jukebox repair/rental business in Osaka, Japan, Kozuki launches Konami to manufacture amusement machines for video arcades.
 May – Hudson Soft Ltd. is established in Sapporo, Japan for the purpose of marketing telecommunications devices and art photographs.
 Taito, an electro-mechanical arcade game manufacturer, enters the video game industry and opens a North American branch.
 Sega, an electro-mechanical arcade game manufacturer, enters the video game industry with Pong clones.
 Computer Space makes appearances in the films Soylent Green and Sleeper.
 Empire versions I, II and III are developed for the PLATO system by John Daleske. Possibly the first team game ever, the first fifty-player game ever, and numerous other innovations.
 Silas Warner takes over PLATO Empire version I and renames it Civilization.
 Lemonade Stand is developed for the first time.
 Maze War, an ancestor of the first-person shooter genre and an early network game, begins development for the Imlac PDS-1 computer.

Best-selling arcade video games in the United States
The following titles were the best-selling arcade video games of 1973 in the United States, according to annual arcade cabinet sales estimates provided by Ralph H. Baer.

Notable releases
 Midway Manufacturing Co. licenses Pong from Atari to produce Winner, their first video game arcade game.
 Atari releases Gotcha, the first commercial maze game, to video arcades.
 Atari releases Pong Doubles to video arcades. A variation on the wildly successful Pong, Pong Doubles is the first video arcade game to include four-player gameplay.
 Atari releases Space Race, the first Arcade Racing game ever.
 Williams Electronics releases Paddle Ball, an unlicensed duplicate of Pong, as their first arcade game.
 BASIC Computer Games was first published. It included 101 games written in BASIC.

See also
1973 in games

References

Video games by year
Video games